An election to Worcestershire County Council took place on 4 June 2009 as part of the 2009 United Kingdom local elections, alongside the 31 other County Councils, five of which are unitary, and a few other areas. The election had been delayed from 7 May, to coincide with elections to the European Parliament. 57 councillors were elected from 53 wards, which returned either one or two county councillors each by first-past-the-post voting for a four-year term of office. The wards were unchanged from the previous election in 2005. The election saw the Conservative Party retain overall control of the council with a majority of 14 seats, up from a majority of just 2 seats.

All locally registered electors (British, Commonwealth and European Union citizens) who were aged 18 or over on Thursday 2 May 2013 were entitled to vote in the local elections. Those who were temporarily away from their ordinary address (for example, away working, on holiday, in student accommodation or in hospital) were also entitled to vote in the local elections, although those who had moved abroad and registered as overseas electors cannot vote in the local elections. It is possible to register to vote at more than one address (such as a university student who had a term-time address and lives at home during holidays) at the discretion of the local Electoral Register Office, but it remains an offence to vote more than once in the same local government election.

County results

Ward results

Redditch South West (Redditch South West and Rural Borough)

Arrow Valley West (Redditch)

Alvechurch (Bromsgrove)

Pershore (Wychavon)

References

External links 
 County Council Election Results 2009. Worcestershire County Council.

2009
2009 English local elections
2000s in Worcestershire